The 1998 Atlanta Braves season marked the franchise's 33rd season in Atlanta and 128th overall.  They went on to win their fourth consecutive division title, taking the National League East title by 18 games over the second place New York Mets.

The team featured six all stars:  shortstop Walt Weiss and third baseman Chipper Jones were voted as starters, while first baseman Andrés Galarraga, catcher Javy López, and pitchers Tom Glavine and Greg Maddux were selected as reserves. Jones and Lopez each hit over 30 home runs as Galarraga (acquired from Colorado) led the club in home runs and RBI. Galarraga finished as an MVP candidate.

The 1998 Braves beat the Chicago Cubs three games to none in the National League Division Series.  In the next round Atlanta then lost to the San Diego Padres in the National League Championship Series four games to two. Despite winning two games after losing the first three, Atlanta's comeback bid came short  by being eliminated in Game 6. San Diego's winning over Atlanta was seen as one of the biggest upsets in postseason history. The Braves failed to go to their fifth World Series of the 1990s.

The 1998 Atlanta Braves are seen as one of the greatest Major League Baseball teams of all time, despite not winning a title. ESPN writer David Schoenfield lists them as one of the top teams in MLB history to not win a World Series

ESPN columnist Jeff Merron also writes that the pitching staff of Maddux, Glavine, John Smoltz, Denny Neagle, and Kevin Millwood was the greatest of all time. The quintet posted a cumulative 2.97 ERA and amassed 88 wins (almost 18 wins per starter), equaling the win total of the 2nd place Mets. The 1998 Braves are the only team in MLB history to have five pitchers each strike out 150 batters in the same season. Glavine, the lone 20 game winner in the National League for that year, won the Cy Young Award.

Offseason
November 17, 1997: Walt Weiss was signed as a free agent with the Atlanta Braves.
January 30, 1998: Dennis Martínez was signed as a free agent with the Atlanta Braves.
February 6, 1998: Curtis Pride was signed as a free agent with the Atlanta Braves.

Regular season

Opening Day starters

C Eddie Perez
1B Andres Galarraga
2B Tony Graffanino
3B Chipper Jones
SS Walt Weiss
LF Ryan Klesko
CF Andruw Jones
RF Michael Tucker
P Greg Maddux

Season standings

Record vs. opponents

Transactions
June 9, 1998: Howard Battle was signed as a free agent with the Atlanta Braves.
June 23, 1998: Alan Embree was traded by the Atlanta Braves to the Arizona Diamondbacks for Russ Springer.
August 14, 1998: Paul Byrd was selected off waivers by the Philadelphia Phillies from the Atlanta Braves.

Roster

Player stats

Batting

Starters by position

Note: Pos = Position; G = Games played; AB = At bats; H = Hits; Avg. = Batting average; HR = Home runs; RBI = Runs batted in

Other batters
Note: G = Games played; AB = At bats; H = Hits; Avg. = Batting average; HR = Home runs; RBI = Runs batted in

Starting pitchers
Note: G = Games pitched; IP = Innings pitched; W = Wins; L = Losses; ERA = Earned run average; SO = Strikeouts

Relief pitchers 
Note: G = Games pitched; W = Wins; L = Losses; SV = Saves; ERA = Earned run average; SO = Strikeouts

National League Division Series

Atlanta Braves vs. Chicago Cubs
Atlanta wins the series, 3-0

National League Championship Series

Game 1
October 7: Turner Field in Atlanta

Game 2
October 8: Turner Field in Atlanta

Game 3
October 10: Qualcomm Stadium in San Diego, California

Game 4
October 11: Qualcomm Stadium in San Diego, California

Game 5
October 12: Qualcomm Stadium in San Diego, California

Game 6
October 14: Turner Field in Atlanta

Award winners
 Tom Glavine, NL Cy Young Award, 
 Tom Glavine, Pitcher of the Month, April
 Tom Glavine, P, Silver Slugger
 Andruw Jones, OF, Gold Glove (Center field)
 Greg Maddux, Pitcher of the Month, June
 Greg Maddux, P, Gold Glove

1998 Major League Baseball All-Star Game
 Chipper Jones, 3B, starter
 Greg Maddux, P, starter
 Walt Weiss, SS, starter
 Andrés Galarraga, 1B, reserve
 Tom Glavine, P, reserve
 Javy López, C, reserve

Farm system

References

External links
 1998 Atlanta Braves team at Baseball-Reference

Atlanta Braves seasons
Atlanta Braves Season, 1998
Atlanta Braves Season, 1998
National League East champion seasons
Atlanta